Gelashvili is a surname. Notable people with the surname include:

Georgi Gelashvili (born 1983), Russian ice hockey goalie
Jaba Gelashvili (born 1993), alpine skier from Georgia
Naira Gelashvili (born 1947), Georgian fiction writer, philologist, Germanist, and civil society activist
Nikoloz Gelashvili (born 1985), Georgian footballer
Tamaz Gelashvili (born 1978), chess grandmaster from Georgia
Valery Gelashvili, Georgian politician and businessman

Surnames of Georgian origin
Georgian-language surnames
Surnames of Abkhazian origin